The 2018–19 season is Liverpool Football Club Women's 30th season of competitive football and its ninth season in the FA Women's Super League and at the top level of English women's football, being one of the league's foundation clubs. It is also its first season following a re-brand from its former name Liverpool Ladies Football Club. Neil Redfearn replaced Scott Rogers as manager before the preseason. Redfearn joins the club after guiding Doncaster Rovers Belles to the crown of FA WSL 2 in the previous season. Redfearn resigned after three months and only two matches in charge, ending his tenure with a 5–0 loss to Arsenal in the league's opening weekend.

First team

Last updated on 18 August 2018.

Transfers and loans

Transfers in

Transfers out

Loans out

Pre-season

Competitions

Women's Super League

FA Cup

FA WSL Cup

Appearances and goals

References

Liverpool L.F.C. seasons